The Ida'an (Idahan or Eraan or Sabahan) people are an ethnic group of Borneo, residing primarily in the Lahad Datu districts on the east coast of Sabah, Malaysia.  Their current population is estimated to be around 6,000 (1987 estimate), but it appears that they once inhabited a much larger area along the east Sabah coast than present. For centuries, the Ida’an have owned exclusive rights to the collection of edible bird's nests in the limestone caves of the region, notably the Madai Caves. Most Ida'an are Sunni Muslims.

See also
 Ida'an language

References

Ethnic groups in Sabah
Kadazan-Dusun people